Pete Wilson is a bronze sculpture depicting the Governor of California of the same name, installed on private property outside San Diego's Horton Plaza, on 225 Broadway in the U.S. state of California. The statue, which cost $200,000, was dedicated in 2007. Approximately 500 people attended the ceremony.

References

2007 establishments in California
2007 sculptures
Bronze sculptures in California
Outdoor sculptures in San Diego
Sculptures of men in California
Statues in California